Russellville is an unincorporated community in Fayette County, West Virginia, United States.

The community derives its name from an early postmaster named Russell.

References

Unincorporated communities in Fayette County, West Virginia
Unincorporated communities in West Virginia